Rhodoleptus nigripennis is a species of beetle in the family Cerambycidae. It was described by Giesbert in 1993.

References

Trachyderini
Beetles described in 1993